Jens Peter Nierhoff (born 2 September 1960) is a retired badminton player of Denmark, noted for his powerful smash, who won a number of international titles in singles and men's doubles during the 1980s.

Career
Nierhoff won men's singles at the 1982 European Championships, and men's doubles at the 1988 European Championships with Michael Kjeldsen.. He competed at the 1983 IBF World Championships in men's singles and lost to Han Jian in quarterfinals. Two years later he won the bronze medal at the 1985 IBF World Championships, losing to Han Jian again, this time in semifinals. Niehoff's accomplishments included singles victories at the Dutch (1984, 1988), Swedish (1984) Canadian (1985), and Scottish (1987) Opens; and doubles titles at the Swiss (1981), Dutch (1988), Canadian (1985, 1988), and Scottish (1987) Opens.

Achievements

World Championships 
Men's singles

Men's doubles

World Cup 
Men's doubles

European Championships 
Men's singles

IBF World Grand Prix 
The World Badminton Grand Prix sanctioned by International Badminton Federation (IBF) from 1983 to 2006.

Men's singles

Men's doubles

References
European results
badminton.dk

Danish male badminton players
Living people
1960 births